Isoplenodia vidalensis is a moth of the family Geometridae. It is found in eastern South Africa.

References

Endemic moths of South Africa
Moths described in 2010
Scopulini